{{Infobox public transit
| name = Kharkiv Metro
| image = Kharkiv Metro logo.svg
| imagesize = 100px
| image2 = 
| imagesize2 = 
| caption2 = The central platform of one of the first stations in the system, Kholodna Hora.
| native_name = Харківський метрополітенKharkivsky Metropoliten
| owner = City of Kharkiv
| locale = Kharkiv, Ukraine
| transit_type = Metro/Subway
| lines = 3
| stations = 30
| ridership =  350,000 (2020 average)
| annual_ridership =  128 million (2020)
| website =  
| began_operation = 1975
| operator = Municipal Enterprise Kharkivsky Metropoliten
| vehicles = 65
| headway = 
| train_length = 5 cars
| system_length = 
| track_gauge =   
| map = 
| map_state = 
| alt = 
| caption = 
| area served = 
| line_number = 
| start = 
| end = 
| chief_executive = Viacheslav Volodymyrovych Salamatin,Director General 
| character = 
| headquarters = 29 Rizdvyana Str., Kharkiv
| el = 825 V DC third rail
}}

The Kharkiv Metro is the rapid transit system that serves the city of Kharkiv, the second largest city in Ukraine. The metro was the second in Ukraine (after Kyiv) and the sixth in the USSR when it opened on August 22–23, 1975. The system transported 223 million passengers in 2018 (up from 212.85 million in 2017).

 History 
thumb|left|150px|Kharkiv metro token|alt=Initial plans for a rapid transit system in Kharkiv were made when the city was the capital of the Ukrainian Soviet Socialist Republic. However, after the capital moved to Kyiv in 1934 and Kharkiv suffered heavy destruction during World War II, a rapid transit system was dropped from the agenda. In the mid-1960s, the existing mass transit system became too strained, and construction of the metro began in 1968.

It is claimed that the metro does not have the beautiful and excessive decorations that stations in Moscow and Saint Petersburg metros show, yet they do make the best of the mid-1970s and later styles. While a metro token is shown below, since 2012 it can no longer be used in Kharkiv.

Tokens were also used in the Kyiv metro until late 2019.

Kharkiv Metro operations were suspended on 17 March 2020 to prevent COVID-19 spread. To compensate for the lack of a metro, the city administration implemented a series of changes in the tram, trolleybus, and bus routes of the city. The metro was reopened on 25 May 2020; face masks or respirators were mandated to wear for passengers.

During the Battle of Kharkiv of the 2022 Russian invasion of Ukraine, the metro was used as a bomb shelter. Kharkiv railway station was also damaged. The subway system was used as a bomb shelter for months. On May 19, 2022, Kharkiv mayor Ihor Terekhov announced that the metro would restart operations and that residents should move out of the metro system.

Lines and stations

Currently, there are 3 lines and 30 stations as follows:

Stations open at 5:30am and close at 11:59pm (the last train departs at around 12:10am, depending on the line) without operations at nighttime except for special occasions, such as the New Year's Eve, the nightly Easter service and the like.

The lines are arranged in the form of a triangle with all junction stations located in the city center and lines extending from there radially, a classic design for many ex-USSR metro systems. The whole of the system is located within the city boundaries without extending to Kharkiv Oblast, however, the new Oleksiyivske Depot, which is currently under construction, will be located immediately behind the current municipal boundary.

Each line has two junction stations connecting it to the other two lines, thus providing the possibility to change from any line to any other line with a single junction. The Pivdennyi Vokzal station is integrated into the city's main railway station of the same name and provides access to all passenger platforms, cash offices and other facilities without the necessity to exit to the surface.

All stations have two tracks with an island platform between them. The stations and lines are located below the ground level except for tracks inside depots and a single metro bridge connecting stations Kyivska and Akademika Barabashova on the Saltivska line. The bridge, however, does not provide any view of the city as it is fully enclosed with non-transparent walls and a roof. The decision to make the metro fully enclosed was made primarily to protect it from heavy snowfalls that often occur in winter, a decision that proved to be right on many occasions, when the metro remained the only mode of passenger transportation functioning in the city.

Line 1 (Kholodnohirsko–Zavodska line)

It is the oldest and the longest line in the Kharkiv Metro with the highest ridership rates and shortest time intervals. Its color is red.

The line was built along the so-called 'central axis' of the city roughly crossing it from East to West. The line serves Moskovsky Prospekt, a street where one of ex-USSR biggest enterprises was located (often called the 'alley of industrial giants'), important transport hubs, the city's main stadium, etc. It replaced, partially or completely, the tram and trolleybus lines with the highest passenger ridership at the time of its construction. Although the ridership pattern has changed considerably since then, the line remains the most important route for passenger transportation in the city.Kholodnohirsko-Zavodska Line starts in the heavily industrialized area, colloquially referred to as Kharkiv Tractor Plant and follows along Moskovsky Prospekt for six stations (from Industrialna to Turboatom), connecting the city's largest enterprises and the residential areas located nearby. Then, it continues through Zavod Imeni Malysheva, one more heavily industrialized area, and arrives at the Sportyvna station, where it is possible to change for Metrobudivnykiv of Oleksiivska line. The station also provides access to the central stadium of Kharkiv, Metalist. After that, the line follows through Prospekt Haharina, a very important transport hub located near the city center, and runs through the 'old' (historical) center for two stations, Maidan Konstytutsii and Tsentralnyi Rynok. Then, it passes through two more large transport hubs, the city's main railway station at Pivdennyi Vokzal, and a large terminal for suburban buses at Kholodna Hora.

Out of the 13 stations composing the line, three are laid deep (Maidan Konstytutsii, Pivdennyi Vokzal and Kholodna Hora); all the others are laid shallow. The line is served by depot TCh-1 Moskovske with Kharkiv's oldest vehicles of type Ezh3, Em-508T, a few trains composed of newer 81-717/714 vehicles and five recently modernized trains 81-710.1.

The intervals are 1–2 minutes during rush hours, 3–5 minutes in-between, and extend up to 15 minutes after 9pm. During the summer vacation season (June–August), intervals can be bigger.

All trains operate the whole length of the line, from Industrialna to Kholodna Hora, except for short trips from Kholodna Hora to Turboatom and from Turboatom to Industrialna. Such trips are usually made around 2-3 p.m. and late in the evening to replace trains on the line or withdraw them to the depot for the night service period, as access is available only through the Turboatom station.

Line 2 (Saltivska line)Saltivska Line is historically the second line of the Kharkiv Metro. Although Oleksiivska Line has surpassed it in terms of line length, Saltivska Line remains second in terms of ridership rates and service frequency. Its color is blue.

The line cuts Kharkiv roughly along the northeast-southwest axis starting in the city center and ending in the Saltivka neighborhood in the North-East. The first plans for constructing the line appeared in the mid-1970s when the city started developing high-rise residential housing on the Saltivske Plateau, a large and flat area near the northeast boundaries of the city. The area was to become the largest residential neighborhood in Europe at the time of its construction, however, it was supposed to be located far from main points of passenger attraction, such as industrial areas, transport hubs, leisure facilities and the like. Thus, the need for a strong link between the neighborhood and other parts of the city became evident.

The construction of the line was performed simultaneously with the development of Saltivka, which helped cut the cost of construction considerably. The section from Akademika Barabashova to Heroiv Pratsi was constructed using the cut-and-cover method for tunnels, which is the cheapest one. The stations located on the line are acclaimed for their concise, yet unique and attractive design. The line also features Kharkiv Metro's only metro bridge.

Initially, it was planned to fork the line at Akademika Barabashova station so that there would be two branches, one of them passing Saltivka from south to north (which is currently in operation) and the other one passing the neighborhood from west to east. According to initial plans, half of the trains arriving from the city center would then follow the south-north branch and the other half would follow the west-east one, alternating in sequence. The south-north branch was never constructed due to financial difficulties and is currently substituted by route 24 of the Kharkiv Trolleybus.Saltivska Line starts in the "old" (historical) center of the city at station Istorychnyi Muzei which also provides a transfer to Maidan Konstytutsii of Kholodnohirsko-Zavodska Line. After leaving the station, the line follows a long and steep ascend to the Universytet station located in the heart of the "new" (business) center, under one of the largest squares in Europe, Svobody Square. It provides a transfer to Derzhprom station on Oleksiivska Line. Then, the line passes one more station in the city center, Pushkinska, and performs a steep dive into the city's lowest part, Zhuravlivka. After a short visit to Zhuravlivka at Kyivska, the line crosses the Kharkiv River via the metro bridge and enters the Saltivka neighborhood. The rest of the stations, from Akademika Barabashova to Heroiv Pratsi are located within the neighborhood, laid approximately at the same (shallow) depth.

The line is characterized by a severe increase in ridership during rush hours and the strong influence of Barabashovo Market, which claims to be the largest market in Europe (located near Akademika Barabashova station, which gave the market its name). The market operates from roughly 8a.m. to 3p.m., increasing the passenger traffic considerably during the morning rush hours, especially on Wednesday, traditionally the discounts day. The traffic on the line also has a distinct student ridership pattern: most of Kharkiv's higher educational establishments are located around Istorychnyi Muzei, Universytet, and Pushkinska stations, but the respective student dormitories are located near Studentska station. Heroiv Pratsi is an important transport hub providing connections to the city's most important tram routes and serving a bus station for suburban routes.

Out of the 8 stations on the line, three are laid deep (Istorychnyi Muzei, Universytet, and Pushkinska); all the others are laid shallow. Pushkinska is the deepest station in the system at 30 meters (98 ft) underground. The line is served by depot TCh-2 Saltivske with vehicles of types 81-717/714 and the only train set of 81-7036/7037. Access to the depot is provided via Akademika Barabashova station.

The intervals are 3–5 minutes during rush hours, 5–6 minutes in-between, and extend up to 20 minutes after 9pm. During the summer vacation season (June–August), intervals can be bigger.

All trains operate the whole length of the line, from Istorychnyi Muzei to Heroiv Pratsi. Starting from 2001, because of power supply issues, every fourth train that operated on the line between rush hours served only the Istorychnyi Muzei - Akademika Barabashova'' segment. The practice was abandoned by the end of 2002 when the power supply normalized.

Line 3 (Oleksiivska line)

Oleksiivska line is historically the third line in the system and the second longest line in the Metro. The line does not have an individual depot; it is served by the same depot which serves the Holodnohirsko-Zavodska line, though a new depot for the line is under construction. In August 2016, the Peremoha station became the first Kharkiv Metro station with disabled access.

Saltivsko-Zavodska Line 
The line is supposed to have a similar route to the tram route 26. Construction of the line is scheduled to start after the opening of the Derzhavynska and Oddeska stations on the Oleksiivska line.

Facts and numbers
As for 2020, the Kharkiv Metro had daily passenger traffic of 350,000 passengers.

2300 employees work in the metro.

Because of the city's uneven landscape, the metro stations are located at varying depths. Six of the system's 30 stations are deep-level stations, and the remaining are shallow. Of the former, all but one are pylon type, and the latter are column type. The shallow stations are fourteen pillar-trispans and eight single vaults. Kharkiv was the first metro to exhibit the single vault design of the shallow type (for technical details, see Skhodnenskaya).

In 2015, new trains were introduced to the metro.

The metro was directly subordinated to the Ministry of Transport of Ukraine. Unlike the Kyiv Metro, Kharkiv is not privatised and is owned by a municipal company. In 2009, the Ministry transferred the metro to the city administration.

In 2020, Chinese manufacturer CRRC Tangshan was selected as the winner of a contract to supply eight five-car trainsets for the Kharkiv metro. It is scheduled for delivery in 2022. The trains will be 96.7 m long and 2,700 mm wide with a maximum speed of 80 km/h. The €45m deal announced on 27 May includes the provision of spare parts, tools and support services.

Ticketing 
A single ride costs ₴8.00 regardless of destination and number of transits within the metro.

The ride can be paid for by:

 paper barcode tickets
 contactless card E-Ticket
 contactless bank card (as well as a smartphone or other NFC-enabled device) on blue-coloured turnstiles directly

E-Ticket cards or paper barcode tickets can be purchased using terminals installed on stations. Terminals accept cash only. E-Ticket cards can be also used in the Kharkiv tram, trolleybus and municipal red bus.

Network map

See also
 Trams in Kharkiv
 Kyiv Metro
 Dnipro Metro
 Kryvyi Rih Metrotram

Notes

References

External links

 Kharkiv Metro – official site 
 Kharkiv Metro – unofficial website 
 Kharkiv Metro track map
 Kharkiv Metro at UrbanRail.net
 Kharkiv Metro at Subways.net
 Metro soyuza – Photographs 
 Kharkiv Transportny – Popular site with resources and images 
 Photos of Kharkiv Metro — on virtual photo gallery Metro 

 
Underground rapid transit in Ukraine
Transport in Kharkiv